Sara Sajeeda is a 2019 television series co-directed by Eoon Shuhaini, Feroz Kader and Rizwan Zaman, starring Tiz Zaqyah, Arslan Asad Butt and Anmol Baloch. It is the Pakistani-Malaysian joint venture produced by Malaysian-based TV production company, Zeel Production. The show premiered on TV3 from 3 October 2019 and concluded on 25 November 2019.

The series is streaming online on YouTube.

Plot 
Sara (Tiz Zaqyah), a lecturer at a private college forced by her father to marry Megat (Fahrin Ahmad). However, their marriage ended after Sara severed the relationship by not being able to stand up to Megat's demeanor as her father did without her own consent.

Fawaad (Arslan Asad Butt), a young man from Pakistan, initially settled abroad returned to his family in Lahore. Soon after, he was offered to work as an engineer in Malaysia. Fawaad is stuck in the interests of his long-lost family or his career. In the end, he chose to start a new life in Kuala Lumpur.

Fawaad and Sara meet in an incident that has prompted Sara to get to know Fawaad more closely. They started liking each other and their marriage was fixed. Unfortunately before marriage, Fawaad was urgently flee to Pakistan after hearing the news of an earthquake that hit his family.

When Fawaad returned home, it turned out that his family was preparing for the wedding. He feels helpless. Despite initially refusing, Fawaad accepts the decision of his mother, Saima and regrets the fate of Sajeeda (Anmol Baloch) who has lost both of her parents in a landslide and earthquake. Upon returning to Malaysia, Fawaad began to split when Sara confessed that she had fallen in love with Fawaad while he had married Sajeeda without love.

Cast

Main
 Tiz Zaqyah as Sara
 Anmol Baloch as Sajeeda
 Arslan Asad Butt as Fawaad Khan

Recurring
 Fahrin Ahmad as Megat
 Hareb Farooq as Mikaal
 Alif Muhaimin as Khalif
 Saima Saleem as Saima
 Raheela Agha as Reema
 Fouziah Gous as Nelisa
 Alizeh Shah as Jasmin
 Shaharuddin Thamby as Tan Sri Ismadi
 Mas Anizan as Puan Sri Norizan
 Zoya Khan as Asha
 Uyaina Arshad as Iman Dahlia
 Aliha Chaudry as Mehwar
 Aneela Agha as Sakinah
 Khalid Saleem Butt as Sheroz Khan
 Rohi Khan as Sarwat
 Ajmal Shezad as Malek Rahman
 Sofia Ibrahim as Tok Nani
 Ali Reza Kavoosi as Salam
 Jasper Supayah as Rita
 Shasha Abedul as Emelda
 Sachal Afzal as Aslam

Cameo appearance
 Mira Filzah as Sofea
 Amri Aziz as Remy

References 

2021 Pakistani television series debuts
2021 Pakistani television series endings
2019 Malaysian television series debuts
2019 Malaysian television series endings
TV3 (Malaysia) original programming
Malaysian drama television series
Urdu-language television shows